The 1927 KLM Fokker F.VIII crash happened on 22 August 1927 when Fokker F.VIII H-NADU of KLM crashed at Underriver, Kent, following structural failure of the tailfin or rudder. The aircraft was operating an international scheduled flight from Croydon, Surrey, to Waalhaven Airport, Rotterdam, the Netherlands. One of the two crew was killed and eight people were injured.

Aircraft
The accident aircraft was Fokker F.VIII H-NADU, c/n 4993. The aircraft was manufactured in 1926 and had entered service with KLM on 24 June 1927.

Accident
About 10 minutes after take-off, a tensioning wire at the tail broke, tearing off the rudder and tailfin. This made the aircraft very difficult to control, with a crash inevitable. The aircraft crashed into the crowns of some trees in the grounds of a large house named St Julian's at Underriver. The mechanic was killed when he was crushed by one of the engines. The pilot and seven passengers were injured. Damage to the aircraft was assessed at ƒ68,985.07.

References

External links
Photo of the crashed aircraft
Photo of the crashed aircraft

Aviation accidents and incidents in 1927
Aviation accidents and incidents in Kent
Sevenoaks District
KLM accidents and incidents
Airliner accidents and incidents caused by in-flight structural failure
1927 in the United Kingdom
1927 disasters in the United Kingdom
Airliner accidents and incidents in the United Kingdom
August 1927 events